Roberto Colazingari (born 7 May 1993) is an Italian slalom canoeist who has competed at the international level since 2008. He is from Subiaco and trains with C.S. Carabinieri, coached by 2012 Olympic Champion Daniele Molmenti. Roberto competed internationally in the C2 discipline in 2011 and 2012, now competing solely in C1.

Colazingari won a bronze medal in the C1 team event at the 2022 ICF Canoe Slalom World Championships in Augsburg. Roberto has also won two medals at the European Championships in the C1 team event with a bronze in 2017 and a silver in 2021 at Tacen and Ivrea, respectively. His best senior world championship results are 5th (C1: 2017, Pau) and 42nd (C2: 2011, Bratislava).

Roberto formed part of an historic triple victory for Italy, winning gold in C1 at the 2019 Canoe Slalom World Cup in Tacen to accompany Stefanie Horn and Giovanni De Gennaro's gold medals in women's and men's K1.

Colazingari has won three gold medals at the U23 World Championships in the C1 team (2015) and C1 (2012, 2014) events. The two individual medals made him the first to win the title twice, an achievement met only by Nicolas Gestin in 2021.

Colazingari began paddling with Subiaco Canoanium Club before joining Corpo Forestale dello Stato on 19 June 2012. He is now a member of the Carabinieri, Italy's national gendarmerie, after it absorbed the State Forestry Corps at the end of 2016.

Results

World Cup individual podiums

Complete World Cup results

References

External links 

 

1993 births
Living people
Italian male canoeists
Medalists at the ICF Canoe Slalom World Championships
21st-century Italian people